"Kennedy and Heidi" is the 83rd episode of the HBO television series The Sopranos, the sixth episode of the second half of the show's sixth season, and the 18th episode of the season overall. Written by Matthew Weiner and series creator and showrunner David Chase and directed by Alan Taylor, it premiered in the United States on May 13, 2007.

Starring
 James Gandolfini as Tony Soprano
 Lorraine Bracco as Dr. Jennifer Melfi
 Edie Falco as Carmela Soprano
 Michael Imperioli as Christopher Moltisanti
 Dominic Chianese as Corrado Soprano, Jr. *
 Steven Van Zandt as Silvio Dante
 Tony Sirico as Paulie Gualtieri
 Robert Iler as Anthony Soprano, Jr.
 Jamie-Lynn Sigler as Meadow Soprano
 Aida Turturro as Janice Soprano Baccalieri
 Steven R. Schirripa as Bobby Baccalieri
 Frank Vincent as Phil Leotardo
 John Ventimiglia as Artie Bucco
 Ray Abruzzo as Little Carmine Lupertazzi
 Dan Grimaldi as Patsy Parisi
 Sharon Angela as Rosalie Aprile
 Kathrine Narducci as Charmaine Bucco
* = credit only

Guest starring

Synopsis
A.J.'s therapist sees that the prescribed drugs are working: he is happier and calmer, and taking college courses again. He continues to spend time with Jason Parisi and Jason Gervasi at their frat house. They laugh about Victor, who had his toes amputated after they injured him with sulfuric acid. The two Jasons and others assault a Somali student while A.J. stands by in distress, doing nothing. He relapses into depression. "Why can't we all just get along?" he says to his therapist.

Phil discovers that the construction/demolition waste that Tony has been sending to Barone Sanitation contains asbestos. At a meeting in New York, he says that he will not accept any more unless he receives a 25% cut; Tony refuses. As Christopher drives him back to Newark, Tony admits he may have to yield, but the waste is eventually dumped into a lake.

Chris is restless as he drives, and Tony looks at him carefully. Their car drifts into the opposite lane, then swerves sharply to avoid an approaching car. They go off the road and the car rolls many times as it descends an embankment. Tony exits the wreckage in pain but with only minor injuries. Chris, who was not wearing a seat belt, is seriously injured, with internal bleeding. He manages to tell Tony to call a taxi as he would not pass a drug test. Tony begins to call for help but abruptly changes his mind. He pinches Chris's nose shut so that he cannot breathe, and he chokes to death on his own blood.

Tony dreams that he tells Dr. Melfi that he killed Chris, Pussy, and Tony B. During his actual session, he recalls Chris as a liability and an embarrassment and says he resents having to feign remorse in front of his family. At the wake, he is disgusted by the display of sorrow. He and Carmela also make an appearance at the wake of Paulie's adoptive mother Nucci, who has died of a stroke; Paulie is angered by the poor attendance but appreciates Tony and Carmela's appearance.

Tony decides to get away to Las Vegas. He meets Sonya, a stripper who was Chris's mistress. They have sex, smoke marijuana, and take peyote. Playing roulette, he has a winning streak. He mumbles, "He's dead," and collapses on the casino floor laughing. With Sonya, he watches the sun rise over the Red Rock Canyon. There is a flash in the sky, and Tony cries: "I get it!"

Deceased
 Christopher Moltisanti: seriously injured in a car crash and then murdered by suffocation by Tony, who squeezes his nose shut when he is gasping for air; he dies choking on his own blood. 
 Marianucci Gualtieri: dies of a stroke

Final appearances
 Ginny Sacrimoni: Johnny Sack's widow

Title reference
 Kennedy and Heidi are the names of the teenage girls driving the car that nearly collides with Christopher's vehicle. Kennedy is the passenger who demands that they stop and notify the authorities, but Heidi refuses for fear of losing her learner's permit for the curfew violation.
Tony remarks that Chris's wife, Kelli, behaves and dresses like Jackie Kennedy at Christopher's wake.

References to prior episodes
 Tony and Phil mention the Barone Sanitation sale, which happened in "The Fleshy Part of the Thigh."
 Tony has been involved in a number of car accidents in the past, and, as in this episode, was not harmed seriously in any of them. He crashed his Suburban when escaping hitmen in "Isabella," crashed it again when passing out from a panic attack in "Guy Walks into a Psychiatrist's Office...," and, in "Irregular Around the Margins", when a wild animal runs in front of his Escalade during a nighttime ride with Adriana, Tony flips it and it gets totaled.
 In the pilot episode, when Christopher is first introduced, he is wearing a baseball cap and driving Tony to New York City. Right before he dies, he is wearing a baseball cap and driving Tony back from New York. According to an article in TV Guide, Michael Imperioli states that he does not know if this is intentional or a coincidence.
 Christopher dies in large part due to his drug addiction (it both contributed to him crashing the car, as he was intoxicated, and as one of the motives for his homicide by Tony). Christopher struggled with his drug addiction for many years, most notably since the trip to Naples, Italy, seen in the Season 2 episode "Commendatori", where he picked up the habit of injecting heroin from the Italian gangster Tanno. Following the drug intervention in "The Strong, Silent Type" (Season 4) and his stay in rehab, Christopher's life was marked with periods of sobriety and relapses after particularly stressful experiences. Additionally, in "The Strong, Silent Type," Tony asks Junior for advice on how he should deal with Christopher, after having learned of his addiction. Junior tells him that he should be "put out of his misery," as it used to be done by the mob in the old days.
 In "The Strong, Silent Type", when Tony discovers during the intervention that Christopher accidentally sat on and suffocated Adriana's dog, Cosette, he remarks that he "ought to suffocate" Christopher. Appropriately, Christopher dies suffocating on his own blood as Tony smothers him.
 In "Long Term Parking," in one of his rants about Tony to Adriana, Christopher says: "That’s the guy, Adriana. My uncle Tony. The guy I’m going to hell for." In "From Where to Eternity" (Season 2) he believed that he went to hell when clinically dead. 
 Right after the scene when Carmela is informed of Christopher's death, Tony awakens suddenly from a dream of Kelli hearing the news. As he awakens, the sound of a crow cawing is heard, just prior to Silvio and Paulie's entering Tony's room to offer condolences. In "Fortunate Son", Christopher saw a crow outside the window during his induction ceremony into the mafia, which he interpreted as a bad omen.
 Carmela tells Tony that it was Christopher who comforted her in the hospital when Tony got shot by Junior ("Join the Club").
 Tony looks up and sees the headlight of a passing car as Christopher dies. This is similar to the white light he sees in his coma dream in "Join the Club".
 At the end of the episode, Tony sees a flash of light over the canyon with the sunrise, and shouts, "I get it!" This may be the same flash of light he sees (but looks away from) in his hotel room during his coma at the end of "Join the Club".
 In "Chasing It", Carlo relates to Tony the Twilight Zone episode, "A Nice Place to Visit", in which a dead gangster, Rocky Valentine, finds himself unable to lose when gambling and able to have any woman or any other pleasure he desires. Originally, he believes himself in Heaven, until it is revealed he is actually in Hell. In this episode, Tony finds himself in a similar situation while in Las Vegas, winning at roulette while standing with Chris's goomar both high on peyote. Also, at one point during this trip, he encounters a flashing red devil logo on a slot machine.

Other cultural and historical references
 Al Lombardo, angry, says that Syracuse is losing a basketball game when in the family gathering after Christopher's death.
 Hanging out with the Jasons, A.J. and a girl compare antidepressants Lexapro and Wellbutrin.
 A.J.'s English professor talks about Wordsworth.
 A.J. says he took a class about and is interested in the Arab–Israeli conflict, and remarks that "nobody knows who started it."
 Carmela is watching an old episode of The Dick Cavett Show wherein Cavett is interviewing Katharine Hepburn.
 At Christopher's wake, Tony comments, "fucking James Brown", when Joanne breaks down crying. He also says the mourning Kelli looks like Jackie Kennedy with her appearance and the sunglasses.
 After witnessing the savage beating of the black cyclist, A.J., distressed, asks his therapist, "Why can't we all just get along?" Rodney King, a black man beaten by Los Angeles police in an incident that sparked national protests and riots, famously asked the same question.

In Popular Culture
 The car crash sequence and Christopher's death are recreated for The Simpsons Season 19 episode "Papa Don't Leech" in which Homer fantasizes about suffocating Abe Simpson after having a near-fatal rollover crash.

Music 
 The song that Christopher puts on the car stereo and on full volume as he is driving Tony right before the crash is Pink Floyd's "Comfortably Numb", performed by Roger Waters featuring Van Morrison & The Band, the first track from the soundtrack of The Departed.
 The song playing when Tony is first being driven in a taxi in Las Vegas is "Are You Alright?" by Lucinda Williams.
 The song playing in the background when Tony first meets Sonya is "Outta My Head" by M. Ward.
 The song playing in the background as Tony and Sonya are having sex is "The Adultress" by The Pretenders.
 The song playing in the background when Tony and Sonya are talking in bed is "Space Invader" by The Pretenders, which was also featured in the season 2 episode "House Arrest."
 The song played over the end credits is "Minas de Cobre (for Better Metal)" by Calexico.

Awards
 The episode's director, Alan Taylor, won the Primetime Emmy Award for Outstanding Directing for a Drama Series at the 59th Primetime Emmy Awards.

External links
"Kennedy and Heidi"  at HBO

The Sopranos (season 6) episodes
2007 American television episodes
Emmy Award-winning episodes
Television episodes written by David Chase